Live at the Floating Jazz Festival is a live recording by clarinetist Kenny Davern and clarinetist and saxophonist Joe Temperley, accompanied by John Bunch among others. Mostly dixieland style jazz on the album, though there are some swing arrangements.

Track listing 
"Bernie's Tune"
"Mood Indigo"
"Three Little Words"
"Blue Monk" 
"Blue Lou"
"Creole Love Song"
"I Can't Believe That You're in Love with Me"
"Undecided"

Personnel
Kenny Davern – clarinet
Joe Temperley – bass clarinet, baritone saxophone
Michael Moore – double-bass
Joe Cohn – guitar
John Bunch – piano
Joe Ascione – drums

References

Kenny Davern albums
Joe Temperley albums
Dixieland revival albums
Live Dixieland albums
Live mainstream jazz albums
2002 live albums
Live swing albums
Chiaroscuro Records live albums